The 2010–11 season is the 90th competitive season of Hereford United Football Club, and their 30th as a Football League club.

The football club saw a change of ownership in the close season with David Keyte and Tim Russon purchasing the majority shareholding in the club; becoming chairman and vice-chairman respectively. After 15 years at the club as manager, chairman and director of football, Graham Turner departed along with long-serving company secretary Joan Fennessy. Turner was subsequently appointed manager of Shrewsbury Town with former backroom staff John Trewick and Tony Ford following him to the Greenhous Meadow.

From a shortlist of three, former Barnsley and Darlington manager Simon Davey was appointed as the new manager, with Andy Fensome as assistant manager. After an extended run of poor form, including 579 minutes without a goal, the pair were sacked on 5th November. Physio and former player Jamie Pitman was placed in temporary charge until the end of 2010, with Russell Hoult as assistant manager/goalkeeping coach.

Since the arrival of the new board, the club has launched a new home strip, held the first Open Day for several years, appointed new club caterers and purchased the lease of Edgar Street, resolving a long-standing issue.

Pre-season

Herefordshire Senior Cup

Friendlies

League Two

FA Cup

League Cup

Football League Trophy

League data

League table

Results summary

Results by round

Squad statistics

Awards

Transfers

References

Hereford United
Hereford United F.C. seasons